Ornipholidotos annae is a butterfly in the family Lycaenidae. It is found in Cameroon, Equatorial Guinea, the Republic of the Congo, Gabon and the Democratic Republic of the Congo. The habitat consists of forests.

References

Butterflies described in 2005
Taxa named by Michel Libert
Ornipholidotos